William Mark Peduto (born October 30, 1964) is an American politician who was the 60th mayor of Pittsburgh, Pennsylvania from 2014 until 2022. He was a Democratic member of the Pittsburgh City Council from 2002 to 2014.

Before his election to the city council, Peduto attended Pennsylvania State University, from which he took a leave of absence before completing his degree. He ran a consulting business and later served as chief of staff to his predecessor on the city council, Dan Cohen. Peduto was elected to the council in 2001 and served from 2002 to 2014. During that time, he ran for mayor three times. In 2005, he lost the Democratic primary to Bob O'Connor, who became mayor in 2006. Peduto again ran in a 2007 special election following O'Connor's death, but dropped out before the primary. He ran for mayor for a third time in 2013, winning the Democratic nomination and the general election with 84% of the vote over Joshua Wander and Lester Ludwig. He was inaugurated in January 2014. In the 2017 election, he ran unopposed and was reelected with 96% of the vote. He ran for a third term in May 2021, but lost the Democratic primary to Ed Gainey. Peduto's second term in office ended in January 2022.

Early life and education
Peduto was born on October 30, 1964.  He graduated from Chartiers Valley High School in 1983. After a year at Carnegie Mellon University, he transferred to Pennsylvania State University, pursuing a degree in political science and becoming president of the university's chapter of the Pi Kappa Alpha fraternity. He dropped out before completing the degree requirements. In 2007, Peduto returned to finish his degree requirements and became the only member of the nine-member Pittsburgh City Council at the time with a bachelor's degree.

Later, Peduto received a master's degree in public policy and management from the University of Pittsburgh.

Career 
Peduto operated a political consulting business and served as general consultant, campaign manager, finance director and other roles for several Democratic candidates and elected officials. At 28, he served as a political director for then Acting Governor Mark Singel. He also worked in Washington, D.C. as an intern to then U.S. Representative George Gekas.

Before holding a seat on the city council, Peduto served as chief of staff to former City Councilman Dan Cohen. In 1996 Peduto was Cohen's campaign manager in a challenge to former U.S. Representative Bill Coyne in the Democratic primary. Peduto is reported to have urged Cohen to accuse Coyne of complacency in obtaining federal funding and other resources for the Pittsburgh area. Cohen lost by a wide margin, which some pundits attributed to voter dislike of his negative advertising.

Pittsburgh City Council

In the 2001 election, Peduto ran for the Pittsburgh City Council District 8 seat being vacated by Cohen, which represents the East End neighborhoods of Bloomfield, Friendship, Oakland, Point Breeze, Shadyside and Squirrel Hill. After being elected to a four-year term, he assumed office in January 2002. He was reelected in 2005 and 2009.

On the city council, Peduto chaired the Committee on General Services, Technology and the Arts, which is in charge of all contracts and purchases as well as city-owned buildings and land. He also oversaw the City Information Systems department, the Cable Bureau and the Art Commission on Council. Peduto has called himself a proponent of progressivism and a "Reform Democrat." He was named one of "100 New Democrats to Watch" by the Democratic Leadership Council in 2003 and one of National Journal's "PA Up and Comers" in 2004 and 2006.

First and second mayoral campaigns
Peduto launched his first campaign for mayor of Pittsburgh in 2005. He lost the primary to eventual general election winner Bob O'Connor. In 2006, after O'Connor died, City Council President Luke Ravenstahl became Mayor. In his second bid for mayor, Peduto mounted a primary challenge to Ravenstahl in the 2007 special election, but ended his campaign before the primary, acknowledging Ravenstahl's popularity. Peduto faced criticism for this decision from the Pittsburgh Post-Gazette editorial board, which accused him of "political cowardice."

Peduto became a political opponent of Ravenstahl's, opposing Ravenstahl's proposal to end Act 47 oversight of Pittsburgh's finances, among other issues. After being reelected to the city council in 2009, he again challenged Ravenstahl in the 2013 Democratic primary.

Mayor of Pittsburgh

In December 2012, Peduto officially launched his third mayoral campaign, announcing that he would challenge Ravenstahl in the 2013 mayoral primary, and was immediately endorsed by Allegheny County Executive Rich Fitzgerald. He simultaneously announced that he would not seek reelection to the city council. Ravenstahl announced in March 2013 that he would not seek another term as mayor. Several other candidates launched campaigns, but after Ravenstahl's exit, it became a two-way race between Peduto and former Pennsylvania Auditor General Jack Wagner. In the May 21 primary, Peduto defeated his opponents, receiving 52% of the vote. Wagner, his closest challenger, received 40%.

In November 2013, Peduto defeated Republican candidate Joshua Wander, who lived in Israel at the time of the election, and independent candidate Lester Ludwig, receiving 84% of the vote. He was inaugurated on January 6, 2014.

Early in his term, Peduto made modernizing Pittsburgh's government a priority. Particular focus was given to the newly created Department of Permits, Licenses, and Inspections which replaced the former Bureau of Building Inspection. Prior to 2014, the Department had only 10 computers for 80 staff members and no online permitting. Today, the City of Pittsburgh has a fully online permitting system.

Peduto is an advocate for ride-sharing in Pittsburgh. After the Pennsylvania Public Utilities Commission issued cease-and-desist orders in July 2014, Peduto called on the state legislature to allow ride-sharing operators to legally operate in Pittsburgh. Subsequently, ride-sharing service Lyft acquired temporary approval for operation in August 2014 pending a hearing regarding a permanent license.

In July 2014, Peduto and the City of Pittsburgh dropped a lawsuit that Ravenstahl had launched against UPMC, challenging its tax-exempt status. Peduto said the suit impeded progress in ongoing negotiations between UPMC and the city on taxes.

In early September 2014, Peduto announced the hiring of Cameron McLay as Pittsburgh Chief of Police, which resulted from an extended search following the resignation and subsequent conviction of Nate Harper on charges of tax evasion and slush fund conspiracy.

Peduto appeared on the CBS television series Undercover Boss in December 2014 as "Ed Chadwick". Following the premise of the show, Peduto disguised himself as a municipal worker to observe rank-and-file Pittsburgh employees. As is customary in the show, Peduto rewarded those whose performance was judged to be exemplary with monetary donations. These donations came from anonymous sources, since ethics laws bar the use of tax revenue. Common Cause Pennsylvania, a government watchdog group, called on the Peduto administration to disclose the donors shortly after the episode aired.

In a statement on Twitter in the run-up to the 2018 primary elections, Peduto announced his support for the legalization of marijuana for recreational purposes.

In 2019, Peduto introduced multiple proposals to city council to restrict firearms access. The bills were eventually passed by the city council after months of heated debate. The bills were met with heavy resistance with lawsuits being threatened, until the city decided to not enforce the laws they passed.

Peduto's tenure also included record investments in Pittsburgh's parks system. He successfully pushed for the passage of a local parks tax referendum to support capital projects.

Between 2019 and 2020, Peduto announced steps to turn around Pittsburgh's long-troubled Water and Sewer Authority. After making leadership changes and major investments, the Pittsburgh Water and Sewer Authority announced its lowest lead levels in 25 years.

On August 18, 2020, Pittsburgh residents protesting police brutality demonstrated outside Peduto's home, staying until 10 am the next day, when police officers declared the assembly unlawful. Later on the 19th, Peduto released a statement criticizing the protests, saying that any demonstration in his residential area "crosses a line that cannot be allowed to continue". The mayor's office later announced that Peduto would be at his home that evening to speak to protesters.

Reelection campaigns
Peduto announced on December 14, 2016, that he was running for reelection in 2017. He faced two challengers in the May primary: John Welch, a progressive minister who challenged Peduto from the left, and city councilwoman Darlene Harris, a longtime foe, who had not filed an official campaign organization. He defeated both to win the Democratic nomination, and did not face any Republican candidate in the general election, as none filed to run in the primary. Peduto was reelected with approximately 96% of the ballots cast on November 7, 2017.

In January 2021, Peduto formally announced his intention to seek a third term in the 2021 election. He lost the May Democratic primary to Ed Gainey.

Post-mayoralty

In April 2022, Carnegie Mellon University announced that Peduto would join the university’s Heinz College of Information Systems and Public Policy as a Distinguished Executive in Residence. His duties include serving as a guest lecturer and co-teaching a course; he will serve through March 2023.

See also
List of mayors of Pittsburgh
City of Pittsburgh
Government of Pittsburgh

References

External links

Bill Peduto for Mayor

|-

1964 births
21st-century American politicians
Carnegie Mellon University trustees
Living people
Mayors of Pittsburgh
Pennsylvania Democrats
Pennsylvania State University alumni
Pittsburgh City Council members
University of Pittsburgh alumni